Chelmsford College is a further education college based in Chelmsford, Essex, England, established in 1962. It has two main campuses, one original site at Moulsham Street and a second in Princes Road. It is a medium-sized college offering 16-19 study programmes, apprenticeships and courses for adults.

in 2014 David Law retired and Andy Sparks was appointed Principal, with Mark Sampford his deputy.

References

External links
 Official website

Education in Chelmsford
Further education colleges in Essex
Educational institutions established in 1962
1962 establishments in England